Zoulikha Bouabdellah (born June 20, 1977) is a Russian-born contemporary artist of Algerian descent. She lives and works in Casablanca and Paris.

Biography 
Bouabdellah moved to France in 1993 during the Algerian Civil War. She studied at the Ecole nationale supérieure d'arts de Cergy-Pontoise, graduating in 2002.

Her work explores the blending of cultures and globalization, religion, language, and intimacy as well as the female condition. It incorporates sculpture, photography, video and drawing, and she often contrasts traditional trappings of religion, e.g., prayer rugs, with symbols of modernity.

Her art has been exhibited at the Venice Biennial, at the Bamako Biennial, at the Aichi Triennale, at the Mead Art Museum, at the Centre Georges Pompidou, at the Brooklyn Museum, at the Tate Modern, at the Mori Art Museum and at the MoCADA. Her work is represented in collections including the Centre Georges Pompidou, Mathaf: Arab Museum of Modern Art, and MUSAC Museum of Contemporary Art.

Awards 
Bouabdellah has received the:
 
 Abraaj Group Art Prize (Dubai)
 Villa Medici Hors les Murs residency

References

External links 

 Contemporary art | Zoulikha Bouabdellah Artiste

1977 births
Living people
Algerian women artists
Algerian artists
20th-century Algerian artists
21st-century Algerian artists